Berthoald, Bertoald, Bertald, Britwold, Bertold, Beorhtwald, Brihtwald, Beorhtweald, Berhtwald, Berthwald, or Beretuald is a Germanic masculine given name, derived from beraht (bright) and wald (woods). It could refer to:
Berthoald, Frankish mayor of the palace
Berthoald, Duke of Saxony
Bertwald, Archbishop of Canterburg
Bertwald of Ramsbury